Carlos Vila Varela (born 15 September 1977 in A Laracha, A Coruña, Galicia) is a Spanish footballer who plays as a midfielder for FC Köniz in Switzerland.

He has spent almost his whole football career in Switzerland. After a lengthy trial, Varela eventually signed with D.C. United on 14 September 2010. In January 2011 he joined Swiss club Servette FC for the 3rd time in his career. At the beginning of the 2011/12 season Servette announced that they were no longer planning with him, therefore as Free agent he signed for FC Wohlen, but left again after just three games (two in the Swiss Challenge League one in the Cup) and joined FC Köniz.

Honours
FC Basel
Swiss Super League: 2002
Swiss Cup: 2003
Uhrencup: 2003
BSC Young Boys
Uhrencup: 2007

References

1977 births
Living people
Spanish footballers
Swiss men's footballers
Spanish expatriate footballers
Servette FC players
FC Basel players
FC Aarau players
BSC Young Boys players
Neuchâtel Xamax FCS players
Swiss Super League players
Swiss Challenge League players
D.C. United players
Association football midfielders
Place of birth missing (living people)
People from Bergantiños
Sportspeople from the Province of A Coruña
Expatriate soccer players in the United States
Major League Soccer players
Footballers from Geneva
Footballers from Galicia (Spain)
Swiss expatriate footballers
Swiss expatriate sportspeople in the United States
Spanish expatriate sportspeople in the United States